Hope Natasha McDonald (born 18 November 1997), known professionally as Hope Tala, is a British singer-songwriter. Her musical style has been described as pulling from R&B, Latin, neo soul, and bossa nova.

Early life
Tala learned to play various musical instruments during her childhood. Tala first started to sing at the age of 15 and wrote her first compositions during her study of music AS-Level. At home, she experimented with Logic Pro, producing demos which she published on SoundCloud. Tala describes her favourite instrument as the guitar, with a preference for nylon guitars but also enjoying acoustic and electric guitars.  Tala's moniker is derived from her birth name. Tala is a diminutive form of her middle name Natasha.

Career

2018–2019: Studies, Starry Ache, Sensitive Soul
Tala studied English literature at the University of Bristol. graduating with first-class honours in 2019. Tala turned down the chance to pursue a master's degree at the University of Cambridge in favor of pursuing a career in music. Tala finished her first and second EPs, Starry Ache and Sensitive Soul, while she was at university. She finished her single Lovestained as she was finishing her dissertation.

Tala's first single was "Blue", released in 2018 which was later included on the EP Starry Ache.  She would proceed to release her singles "Lovestained" and "D.T.M." in 2019. "Lovestained" was written as Tala was working towards her degree in English literature. Tala's "Lovestained" would later be placed on Rolling Stone'''s "50 Best songs of 2019" list at #8. The two singles would be compiled into her EP Sensitive Soul.

2020–present: Girl Eats Sun and other singles
Tala's "All My Girls Like To Fight" was her first song in 2020. It was around this time that Tala had declined pursuing a master's degree in favour of a career in music. Speaking to Wonderland, Tala described music as a "one-shot career" and that she would have "regretted continuing her studies" when there was the opportunity to continue on later in life. Tala described writing "All My Girls Like To Fight" as "constructing an expansive narrative in a song" and she "wanted to portray women having strength and agency in the narrative". The song would be included in her EP Girl Eats Sun.

Although Tala has released a number of EPs and singles, as of June 2022 none of them have entered any mainstream charts.

Critical reception
Tala's All My Girls Like To Fight was listed as one of Barack Obama's favourite songs of 2020. Her song Tiptoeing'' was chosen by Clara Amfo as BBC Radio One's "Hottest Record in the World" on 19 October 2021.

Personal life
Tala is bisexual and considers herself Black or Mixed Race.

Discography

Extended plays

Singles

References

British people of Jamaican descent
Living people
Bisexual musicians
Bisexual women
British LGBT singers
Black British singers
Alumni of the University of Bristol
1997 births
LGBT Black British people